is a former Japanese football player.

Club statistics

References

External links

1984 births
Living people
Association football people from Kumamoto Prefecture
Japanese footballers
J1 League players
J2 League players
Japan Football League players
Gamba Osaka players
Sagan Tosu players
Roasso Kumamoto players
Association football defenders